Olivia Elizabeth "Polly" Powrie  (born 9 December 1987) is a New Zealand sailor. She has won Olympic and world championship titles in the 470 class, and is also a former 420 world champion.

Biography 
Powrie and her sailing partner Jo Aleh, who were known as "Team Jolly", won the gold medal in the 470 class at the 2012 Summer Olympics. In August 2013, exactly a year after winning their Olympic gold medal, Aleh and Powrie won the world title at the 2013 470 World Championships in La Rochelle, France. She and Aleh were named ISAF Female Sailor of the Year, the first New Zealand women to win that award.

Powrie is a graduate of St Cuthbert's College, Auckland.

In the 2013 New Year Honours, Powrie was appointed a Member of the New Zealand Order of Merit for services to sailing.

Powrie announced her retirement from Olympic sailing on 6 January 2017.

References

External links
 
 
 
 
 
 

1987 births
420 class world champions
470 class world champions
ISAF World Sailor of the Year (female)
Living people
Medalists at the 2012 Summer Olympics
Medalists at the 2016 Summer Olympics
Members of the New Zealand Order of Merit
New Zealand female sailors (sport)
Olympic gold medalists for New Zealand in sailing
Olympic silver medalists for New Zealand
People educated at St Cuthbert's College, Auckland
Sailors at the 2012 Summer Olympics – 470
Sailors at the 2016 Summer Olympics – 470
Sportspeople from Auckland
World champions in sailing for New Zealand